Neb Bluff is a conspicuous rock bluff 6 nautical miles (11 km) south of Orford Cliff on the west coast of Pernik Peninsula, Loubet Coast in Graham Land, overlooking the east side of Lallemand Fjord. Surveyed by Falkland Islands Dependencies Survey (FIDS) in 1956 and so named because of its snout-like appearance.

References
 SCAR Composite Gazetteer of Antarctica.

Cliffs of Graham Land
Loubet Coast